Cho-looke, the Yosemite Fall is an 1864 oil painting on canvas by Albert Bierstadt.

References

1864 paintings
Paintings by Albert Bierstadt
Paintings in the collection of the Timken Museum of Art